Stoycho Stoilov (born 15 October 1971) is a Bulgarian former football midfielder. He is currently employed in an official capacity with CSKA Sofia.

Club career
Stoilov was born in Blagoevgrad. In his career he played for Pirin Blagoevgrad, CSKA Sofia, Dobrudzha Dobrich and Litex Lovech, making a name for himself with the latter when they won their first two domestic titles in the late 1990s. He reached a Bulgarian Cup final with his hometown club, finishing as runner-up. Stoilov also had a spell with 1. FC Nürnberg in the German Bundesliga.

On 14 November 2002, Stoilov (who was at the time the captain of Litex Lovech and was suffering from a broken foot, which had occurred after being subjected to a tackle in a game against CSKA Sofia), was seriously wounded, sustaining life-threatening injuries, after being shot by former army serviceman Simeon Mechev, following a traffic dispute. Stoilov managed to recover after extensive treatment, but the incident effectively spelt the end of his playing career. The culprit was originally to spend 10 years in prison, but his sentence was eventually reduced to 6 years. Mechev was released from jail in August 2011 after remaining behind bars for approximately four years.

International career
Stoilov earned his first cap for Bulgaria on 25 March 1998, in the 0:1 away loss against Macedonia in a friendly match, substituting Krasimir Balakov in the 73rd minute. He was in the Bulgarian squad at the 1998 FIFA World Cup, although he did not play in any games.

International goal
Scores and results list Bulgaria's goal tally first.

Administrative work
Following his retirement, Stoilov became part of the organizational management of Litex Lovech, continuing in this role with CSKA Sofia since 2016.

Personal life
He has distant Greek roots and Litex Lovech helped him obtain a Greek passport under the name Stoykas Stoilas, so that Stoilov could be issued a work visa as a citizen of a European Union member state, potentially making it easier for him in the case of a transfer to a British club. In June 1999 Stoilov entered Germany with the document when he joined 1. FC Nürnberg. However, in 2001, a German court declared that the passport had been invalid and imposed an 8-month conditional sentence.

Honours

Club
CSKA Sofia
 Bulgarian A Group: 1991–92

Litex Lovech
 Bulgarian A Group: 1997–98, 1998–99

1. FC Nürnberg
 2. Bundesliga: 2000–01

References

External links

Living people
1971 births
Sportspeople from Blagoevgrad
Association football midfielders
Bulgarian footballers
Bulgaria international footballers
OFC Pirin Blagoevgrad players
PFC CSKA Sofia players
PFC Dobrudzha Dobrich players
PFC Litex Lovech players
1. FC Nürnberg players
First Professional Football League (Bulgaria) players
Bulgarian expatriate footballers
Expatriate footballers in Germany
Bulgarian expatriate sportspeople in Germany
1998 FIFA World Cup players
Macedonian Bulgarians